The Storozhevoy class were a group of 18 destroyers built for the Soviet Navy in the late 1930s that were officially known as Project 7U ( (Improved)). The main changes were unit machinery (four boilers instead of three), a strengthened hull and reduced fuel capacity. The anti-aircraft guns were repositioned to improve firing arcs. The ships fought in World War II.

Background and description
Naval historians Yakubov and Worth state that the change to unit machinery was due to an incident when the British destroyer  was stopped due to machinery damage by a mine during neutrality patrols in the Spanish Civil War. The incident was reported at a meeting where Joseph Stalin was present and he ordered that the ships be redesigned with unit machinery so that a ship could still move if one of the two boiler or engine rooms were incapacitated. This change in design saved  following mine damage in 1941, but led to a considerable delay in the Soviet destroyer program and the cancellation of six Type 7 ships. Fitting the additional machinery in the same hull presented significant challenges, leading to an increase in weight, cramped accommodation and a reduction in fuel capacity. These changes led Soviet sailors to nickname the Type 7U, 7 Ukhudshennyi (ухудшенный, made worse).

Their crew numbered 207 officers and sailors in peacetime and 271 in wartime.

The designers had been conservative in rating the turbines and many, but not all, of the ships handily exceeded their designed speed during their sea trials.  reached  during her trials in 1941, but  only managed .

Armament and fire control

As built, the Storozhevoy-class ships mounted four 50-caliber  B-13 guns in two pairs of superfiring single mounts fore and aft of the superstructure. Each gun was provided with 150 rounds. The development of the gun was troubled by excessive barrel erosion problems and three variants were built in a not entirely successful effort to resolve the problem which complicated logistical and operational support as each performed slightly differently. The manually operated mounts had an elevation range between -5° to +45° and had a rate of fire of 6–10 rounds per minute.

Anti-aircraft defense was provided by two 55-caliber  34-K AA guns and three 46-caliber  21-K AA guns, all in single mounts as well as four  DK or DShK machine guns. The 34-K guns could elevate between -5° and +85°, had a rate of fire of 15–20 rounds per minute, and the ships carried 300 rounds per gun for them. The 21-K was a converted anti-tank gun with a rate of fire of 25–30 rounds per minute with an elevation range between -10° and +85°. The Project 7Us stowed 500 rounds for each gun.

The ships were equipped with six  torpedo tubes in two rotating triple mounts amidships; each tube was provided with a reload. The Project 7U-class ships primarily used the 53-38 or the 53-38U torpedo, which differed only in the size of their warhead; the latter had a warhead  heavier than the  warhead of the 53-38. The ships could also carry a maximum of either 60 or 96 mines and 25 depth charges.

Fire control for the main battery of the Storozhevoys was provided by a Mina-7 fire-control system that was derived from an Italian Galileo system. It included a TsAS-2 mechanical analog computer that received information from a KDP2-4 gunnery director on the roof of the bridge which mounted a pair of DM-4  stereoscopic rangefinders. Anti-aircraft fire control was strictly manual with only a DM-3  rangefinder to provide data to the guns. Some ships received the Soyuz high-angle fire-control system for the 34-K guns. It consisted of a mechanical analog computer, a Gazon vertical gyroscope and an SVP-29 stabilized viewfinder. The system could handle targets like bombers flying level, but was useless against aircraft attacking in a dive.

Modifications
Later in the war electronic equipment such as radar and sonar were supplied by the Allies for these ships.

Ships
All of the ships of the class were originally begun as Type 7 destroyers and their partially completed hulls were broken up and relaid down as Type 7Us. Those ships shown with two shipyards were begun at the first and were then towed to the second one for completion.

Service history

Black Sea Fleet 
After the 22 June 1941 start of Operation Barbarossa, the German invasion of the Soviet Union, Smyshlyony and Soobrazitelny were tasked to support Kharkov and Moskva in the 26 June Raid on Constanța together with the cruiser . A grounded paravane on Smyshlyony prevented her from rendezvousing on schedule, while Soobrazitelny became separated from the cruiser in the dark. Both destroyers helped escort the damaged Kharkov back to base. Sposobny and Svobodny joined the 3rd Division when they entered service during the war. All three destroyers in service were on escort duty in July and from late August they escorted transports and provided fire support to the defenders of besieged Odessa. Sovershenny never joined the fleet as she was heavily damaged by a Soviet mine during trials. Soobrazitelny was the only one of the five Project 7Us completed for the Black Sea Fleet to survive the war.

Citations

References

Further reading

External links

 

 
Destroyer classes
World War II destroyers of the Soviet Union
Destroyers of the Soviet Navy